Ethiopian Airlines Flight 409 was an international commercial flight scheduled from Beirut to Addis Ababa that crashed into the Mediterranean Sea shortly after takeoff from Rafic Hariri International Airport on 25 January 2010, killing all 90 people on board. This was the first fatal crash for Ethiopian Airlines since the hijack of Ethiopian Airlines Flight 961 in 1996.

Aircraft and crew

The aircraft involved was a Boeing 737-8AS, registration ET-ANB, s/n 29935. It had its maiden flight on 18 January 2002, and was delivered new to Ryanair on 4 February 2002 as EI-CSW. Provided with twin CFM56-7B26 powerplants, the airframe last underwent maintenance checks on 25 December 2009 without any technical problems found. It was  old at the time the accident took place.

The captain was 44-year-old Habtamu Benti Negasa, who had been with Ethiopian Airlines since 1989. He was one of the airline's most experienced pilots having logged 10,233 flight hours, including 2,488 hours on the Boeing 737. The first officer was 23-year-old Aluna Tamerat Beyene. He was far less experienced than the captain, having worked for Ethiopian Airlines for only a year and having 673 flight hours, 350 of them on the Boeing 737.

Accident
The Boeing 737 took off from runway 21 at Beirut–Rafic Hariri International Airport in stormy weather, with 82 passengers and eight crew members on board. Radar contact was lost a few seconds before it crashed into the Mediterranean Sea at 02:41 local time (UTC +2/EET), four or five minutes after take off. Witnesses near the coast reported seeing the aircraft on fire as it crashed into the sea.

Search and recovery
The search for survivors was carried out by the Lebanese Army, using Sikorsky S-61 helicopters, the Lebanese Navy and UNIFIL troops. The U.S. military, in response to a request from the Lebanese government, sent the guided missile destroyer , a Navy Lockheed P-3 Orion aircraft, and the salvage ship . The French Navy sent a Breguet Atlantic reconnaissance aircraft. UNIFIL sent three ships (among them the German minesweeper tender Mosel and the Turkish corvette Bozcaada) and two helicopters to the scene. Further helicopters were sent by the Royal Air Force, and the Cyprus Police Aviation Unit.

On 7 February, Lebanese Army divers recovered the plane's flight data recorder and cockpit voice recorder (CVR). The CVR was missing a memory storage unit when found. This was reported on 16 February as having been recovered.  All were sent to the French Bureau d'Enquêtes et d'Analyses pour la Sécurité de l'Aviation Civile (BEA) for analysis.

All the deceased were recovered from the sea by 23 February. The recovered bodies were sent to the Rafik Hariri University Hospital in Beirut for DNA testing and identification. They were all identified by the end of February.

Investigation
The Lebanese Civil Aviation Authority (LCAA) investigated the accident, with the assistance of the BEA, Boeing, and the National Transportation Safety Board (NTSB) of the United States.

Lebanese President Michel Suleiman stated before the flight data recorders were found that the crash was not due to terrorism. Lebanese Information Minister Tarek Mitri rejected the notion that the aircraft should not have been allowed to take off under the current weather conditions, stating that "many" other aircraft had taken off during the time period.

Final Investigation Report

The final investigation report was created by the Lebanese Civil Aviation Authority (LCAA), part of the Lebanese Ministry of Public Works and Transport, and on the 17January 2012 presented.

Possible Fire on Board

It noted that eyewitnesses, including an air traffic controller, and a crew flying in the vicinity of Flight 409, had reported seeing an "orange light", "an orange explosion", or "a ball of fire" which matched "the time and calculated location of the accident". The LCAA speculates, in their report, that impressions of explosions or fire may have been caused by the aircraft lights during the steep dive or by "thunderstorm activities in the area". As "no sign of any explosion or fire were detected on the wreckage" or "during the autopsies carried on some of the bodies".

Black Soot

On the wreckage "a black soot near the APU exhaust" was found with "some wrinkle on the metal". A laboratory examination by the NTSB "confirmed that the black soot was not related to excessive heat or fire", because "Zinc chromate primer paint changes color when exposed to heat" and "there was no change in the color of the paint on the primer side". The spectrum analysis suggests that the black soot "was organic" and it "most closely matched spectra from lubricating oils".

Cause of the Accident
The report concluded that "the probable causes of the accident were the flight crew's mismanagement of the aircraft's speed, altitude, headings, and attitude through inconsistent flight control inputs resulting in a loss of control and their failure to abide by CRM [Crew Resource Management] principles of mutual support and calling deviations".

Response by the Airline

Ethiopian Airlines stated they "strongly refutes [sic]" the report, and that it "was biased, lacking evidence, incomplete and did not present the full account of the accident". 

The airline released a press statement on the day the investigation report was presented. In it, they pointed out that the halting of flight data and cockpit voice recordings at 1,300 feet (ca. 396 meters), disappearing from radar at that time, and eyewitness reports of a fireball "clearly indicate that the aircraft disintegrated in the air due to explosion, which could have been caused by a shoot-down, sabotage, or lightning strike."

Passengers and crew
Ethiopian Airlines issued the following list of the nationalities of the victims:

A memorial ceremony was held at the Ethiopian Airlines premises in Addis Ababa on 14 February 2010.

In the media
The crash was dramatized in the twelfth series of the Canadian documentary Mayday (also known as Air Emergency or Air Crash Investigation). It is titled "Heading to Disaster". The episode re-creates the crash based on the Lebanese investigators' final report.

See also

 Ethiopian Airlines accidents and incidents
Colgan Air Flight 3407, another accident where two overtired pilots lost control of their aircraft

References

External links

 Ministry of Public Works and Transport
Progress Report – 25 January 2010 (Archive)
 Progress Report – 31 July 2010 (Archive)
Final Report  17 January 2012 (Alternate) (Archive)
 Annexes to the final report
 Comments by the Ethiopian Civil Aviation Authority on the Accident Investigation of Ethiopian Flight 409, Boeing 737-800, ET-ANB, 25 January 2010 (Archive) Ethiopian Civil Aviation Agency
Ethiopian Airlines Flight 409 on 25 January 2010 B 737-800, registered ET-ANB( ) – Bureau d'Enquêtes et d'Analyses pour la Sécurité de l'Aviation Civile
 Boeing Statement on Ethiopian Airlines Accident in Lebanon – Boeing
 BBC Photos
 Names of Ethiopian Passengers Released from Plane Crash- ECTV Endale G
Names of Lebanese Passengers Released from Plane Crash (Archive) – Naharnet
 

2010 disasters in Asia
2010 in Ethiopia
2010 in international relations
2010 in Lebanon
Accidents and incidents involving the Boeing 737 Next Generation
Airliner accidents and incidents caused by pilot error
Aviation accident investigations with disputed causes
Aviation accidents and incidents in 2010
Aviation accidents and incidents in Lebanon
409
January 2010 events in Asia
January 2010 events in Lebanon